Dario Vidošić ((born 8 April 1987) is a former Australian footballer and current coach who is the interim manager of A-League Women club Melbourne City FC Women.

Club career

Early life 
Vidošić was born on 8 April 1987 in Osijek to Croatian parents, mother Jasna and father Rado Vidošić. He moved with his parents from Croatia to Australia in 1988 when his father received an offer to play for the Queensland Lions. The family settled in Brisbane, and he attended Yugumbir State School for his early education at Regents Park, when Dario grew up he attended Cavendish Road State High School. His father has been assistant coach at A-League club Queensland Roar since 2005 and as of May 2008, is the club's National Youth Team coach.

Vidošić played with Queensland Lions in 2004 and also competed in the 2004 National Schoolboys football competition. He received a scholarship to the Australian Institute of Sport and trained in their football (soccer) program before moving onto the A-League, signing a two-year contract with Queensland Roar at the start of the 2006–07 season.

Brisbane Roar 
In Round 1, coming on as a substitute in the second half, Vidošić set up a goal for Scotsman Simon Lynch before scoring a goal himself. Vidošić started up front for Queensland Roar in Round 8 against Perth Glory and scored to make it 2–1 in the Roar's favour, before being substituted. In Round 17, with midfielder Matt McKay out injured, Vidošić started against the Central Coast Mariners and scored two goals; becoming the first player under the age of 21 to score 2 goals in an A-League game, and the first player under the age of 20 to score more than three goals in a season. Vidošić scored once more in the season, against Melbourne Victory in Round 20.

1. FC Nürnberg 
His performance in the season was enough for the German Bundesliga club 1. FC Nütnberg to give him a two-week trial. 1. FC Nürnberg was a club that had strong Australian ties with four other players at the time, two of whom had come from the A-League the previous season. It was confirmed on 22 March 2007 that Vidošić had accepted a three-year contract with the Bundesliga club.

He was rarely used in his first season at the club, seeing just 60 minutes of playing time in four games for the Bundesliga side that was relegated at the end of the season. However, he was an integral part of the reserve side's promotion efforts that saw 1. FC Nürnberg II reach the newly organised Regionalliga Süd.

In the following season, he was hampered by injury trouble early on, seeing just three matches for the professional team and four – with one goal – for the reserve side before the winter break. He went on to unsuccessfully trial with Danish club Esbjerg fB.

Surprisingly, Vidošić appeared back on the scene when he was brought on in a first team match against SC Freiburg in which he scored his first competitive goal for 1. FC Nürnberg, giving the team the 1–0 win at Dreisamstadion. After that match, Vidošić won more opportunities in the Nürnberg first-team scoring another crucial goal in a 1–0 win over FC Ingolstadt 04 in early May, before another a week later in the Franconian derby against Greuther Fürth which ended 1–1. Vidošić went on to help Nürnberg seal promotion back to the Bundesliga.

In an interview in May 2009, Vidošić admitted a debut call-up to the Australian national football team would be a dream end to a great season.

MSV Duisburg 
On 19 January 2010 his club 1. FC Nürnberg announced that the 22-year-old offensive midfielder will play on loan for MSV Duisburg the rest of the season.

Arminia Bielefeld 
On 1 January 2011, Vidošić moved to Arminia Bielefeld on loan for the rest of the 2010–11 season after only making five appearances for Nürnberg prior to the loan.

Adelaide United 

In July 2011, Vidošić returned to Australia and signed a 3-year contract with A-League club Adelaide United as their Australian marquee on a reported AU$320,000 a season. He scored his first goal for the club in just his second game against Sydney F.C.

FC Sion 

On 26 August 2013, Adelaide United announced that they had released Dario from his contract so he could continue his career playing for Swiss club FC Sion for a transfer fee of AU$700,000.

Western Sydney Wanderers 
Western Sydney Wanderers confirmed that Vidošić has joined the club on a two-year deal on 21 September 2015.

Liaoning Whowin 
Liaoning Whowin confirmed that Vidošić has joined the club on 22 June 2016. He was introduced right away into the starting line-up and made his debut the same week against Guangzhou R&F.
Following changes to the Chinese Super League's foreign allowance and Liaoning Whowin signing Australians Robbie Kruse and James Holland, Vidošić was released along with his Australian teammate Michael Thwaite in February 2017.

Seongnam FC 
On 17 February 2017, a Korean media reported his move to Seongnam FC as a free agent. In June 2017, Vidošić's contract was officially terminated by mutual consent.

Wellington Phoenix 
On 4 August 2017, it was reported that Vidošić would be joining his father Rado at Wellington Phoenix on a one-year deal. On 20 December 2017, both Vidošić and his father left the club.

Melbourne City 
On 29 December 2017, shortly after leaving Wellington Phoenix, Vidošić joined Melbourne City.

ATK
In July 2019, ATK confirmed that they had signed Vidošić as their final foreign signing for the 2019–20 ISL season. His start to his career with ATK was rough, as he sustained an injury in preseason that kept him out of action for the first half of the season.

International career 

In October 2006, Vidošić was selected in the Australian Under-20 squad, known as the Young Socceroos, and went on to compete in the 2006 AFC Youth Championships in India. In February 2007, he played for the Australian Under-23 team, the Olyroos, in an Olympic qualifier in Adelaide, scoring the 11th goal in Australia's 11–0 win over Chinese Taipei.

In July 2008, after being left out of the Australian Olympic team for Beijing by Olyroos head coach Graham Arnold, he publicly mooted the possibility of playing for the Croatian national team at a senior level. However, according to FIFA Article 18, Vidošić has been ineligible to represent any country other than Australia in international football since April 2008, when he turned 21.

On 17 June 2009, Vidošić made his debut for the Socceroos in their last World Cup qualifier against Japan, he was substituted in for Tim Cahill in the 86th minute. His second cap was received while playing in a friendly against the Netherlands on 10 October 2009.

|-

|}

Career statistics

Club

References

External links 

 
 
 
 Adelaide United Profile 
 OzFootball profile
 	

Living people
1987 births
Sportspeople from Osijek
Soccer players from Brisbane
Sportsmen from Queensland
Croatian emigrants to Australia
Yugoslav emigrants to Australia
Association football midfielders
Australian soccer players
Australian expatriate sportspeople in Germany
Australian expatriate sportspeople in Switzerland
Australian expatriate soccer players
A-League Men players
Brisbane Roar FC players
Adelaide United FC players
Western Sydney Wanderers FC players
1. FC Nürnberg players
Seongnam FC players
Wellington Phoenix FC players
Melbourne City FC players
Bundesliga players
2. Bundesliga players
Swiss Super League players
Expatriate footballers in Germany
Expatriate footballers in Switzerland
Australia international soccer players
MSV Duisburg players
Arminia Bielefeld players
FC Sion players
Liaoning F.C. players
ATK (football club) players
Expatriate footballers in China
Australian expatriate sportspeople in China
Chinese Super League players
2010 FIFA World Cup players
2014 FIFA World Cup players
Australian Institute of Sport soccer players
Marquee players (A-League Men)
Australian people of Croatian descent